Ceutorhynchus semirufus is a species of minute seed weevil in the family Curculionidae. It is found in North America.

References

Further reading

 
 
 

Ceutorhynchini
Beetles described in 1876